Eko is an Italian manufacturer of electric guitars, acoustic guitars and similar instruments, catering to professional level and manufacturing largely for export. It is located in Recanati, Marche.

Products

Guitars

Their products include classical guitars, 12-string guitars, arch top guitars, electric guitars and acoustic bass guitars.

Eko gained high popularity during the rock 'n' roll craze of the 1960s, becoming the largest guitar exporter in Europe. Their electric models were often highly ornamented with pearl, featured 3 or 4 pickups and recognizable "rocker" switches for pickup selection. The acoustic models were popular in country and folk rock bands of the late '60s. The best-known models of the '60s include:

 Eko 400 Ekomaster (Fender Jaguar shape with flat-top,  Hagström-style control panel),
 Eko 500 (Fender Jaguar lookalike),
 Eko 700 (original triple-cutaway design with "hockey stick" head),
 Eko 290 (also known as Eko Barracuda, semi-hollow flat-top electric),
 Eko Rokes (rocket-shaped electric, made popular by an Italian pop band of the same name, The Rokes)
 Eko Kadett ('67 original double cutaway with characteristic long "horns") and
 Eko Ranger (the best-selling Eko product, acoustic in 6 and 12-string version).
 Eko 995 (violin bodied 4 string bass wildly popular in the late 60's)

Eko also produced guitars for Vox in the '60s, in the USA they were distributed through LoDuca brothers of Milwaukee, Wisconsin.
 Vox Mark III
 Vox Phantom
 Vox Ultrasonic

In the UK the instruments were imported by Rose-Morris, London.

In Australia their instruments were imported by Rose Music and often, but not always, branded with their house brand Eston.

Eko guitar has been manufacturing guitars since the early 60s and continue to through present day.

As of 2015, Eko guitars were imported and distributed in the United States by Kelley Distribution of Fort Lauderdale, Florida.

Other musical instruments

See also

 List of Italian Companies
 Vox (musical equipment)

References

External links

Official sites
 U.S. Eko website
 Eko Music Group (Italy)
 Eko guitars (Italy)

Musical instrument manufacturing companies of Italy
Electronics companies of Italy
Italian brands
Guitar manufacturing companies
Electronic organ manufacturing companies
Companies based in le Marche
Electronics companies established in 1959
Italian companies established in 1959